Paleophycology (also once known as paleoalgology) is the subdiscipline of paleobotany that deals with the study and identification of fossil algae and their evolutionary relationships and ecology.

The field is very important in the science of paleolimnology as the algae leave many indicators of fossil ecosystems. Primary and most familiar are both fossil shells from diatoms and biogeochemical traces of algal pigments in lake sediments. These fossils are clues to changes in nutrient availability and ecology of lakes.

Some paleophycologists:

John P. Smol, a Canadian paleolimnologist
Stanley Awramik, an American Precambrian paleontologist
Bruno R. C. Granier, a French stratigrapher and micropaleontologist
Robert Riding, a British geologist and expert on calcareous algae and stromatolites

References

Subfields of paleontology
Paleobotany
Branches of botany
Fossil algae